Patrice Abry from the CNRS & Ecole Normale Suprieure de Lyon, Lyon Cedex 07, France was named Fellow of the Institute of Electrical and Electronics Engineers (IEEE) in 2012 "for contributions to the theory and applications of fractal analysis and multifractal analysis in signal and image processing".

References 

Fellow Members of the IEEE
Living people
Year of birth missing (living people)
Place of birth missing (living people)